The Pauma massacre occurred in December 1846, at Pauma Valley north of Escondido, California. Luiseño Indians killed eleven Mexicans, Californio lancers who had stolen horses from them. The action was related to a series of regional conflicts during the Mexican–American War and followed the Battle of San Pasqual in California. Fundamentally, it was also related to the appropriation of Mission Luiseno land from the Luiseño after the successful mission with a population of 3,000 was secularized in 1833. Gov. José Figueroa had granted the Luiseño three pueblos including Las Flores and San Pascual. Pío Pico was to hold the mission land in trust for the government as administrator pending a decision on what to do with it. Eventually, Pico took Las Flores as his personal ranch. Pico was the man who led the Mexicans at the battle of  San Pascual. The Kumeyaay Indians lived at San Pascual, though the Kumeyaay were from the next mission, San Diego, they also viewed Pio Pico with distrust, and their sympathies for the Americans may have been decisive, given their knowledge of the terrain in which they lived. The Mexicans lost and afterwards took 11 horses from a nearby Luiseño community, which then retaliated by killing 11 Mexican Californio soldiers at the Massacre of Pauma.

Background
After the Battle of San Pasqual, the Californio lancers, a Mexican military force, broke up into different groups.  A group of eleven men traveled to Rancho Pauma, owned by Jose Antonio Serrano.  Along the way, the men stole a herd of fine horses belonging to the Pauma band of the Luiseño and retreated to the rancho.

Serrano, his fourteen-year-old son Jésus, and his brother-in-law Jose Aguilar had gone to Pala, where Serrano's wife and other children were staying.  Before leaving, Serrano was said to overhear two Luiseño women discussing a plot to capture the Californios.

The events
In the evening Chief Manuelito Cota (also called Chief Manuel) took a group of the Pauma band with him to Rancho Pauma.  The chief knocked on the door and introduced himself.  The Californios knew the chief and had peaceful relations with him.  When the Californios opened the door, the chief and his men captured the lancers.

They took eleven prisoners to El Potrero, an Indian rancheria, for the night.  The next day the party traveled to Aqua Caliente (Warm Springs, now known as Warner Springs).  Chief Manuel called the area bands together for a tribal council to decide the fate of the horse thieves.  Most tribal chiefs believed the prisoners should be scarred and then released.  William Marshall, a local American, entered the debate.  He swayed the vote in favor of executing the prisoners.

The tribal leaders decided the Californios should undergo ritual torture and execution for their crimes against the Pauma band. After the Californios witnessed the first execution, the men wept and begged for their lives. Santos Alipas, thirteen years old, stood up and reportedly said, "What's the use of crying?  We can only die once; let us die like brave men."  Impressed with Alipas' bravery, the Luiseños gave him a choice on how he wanted to die.  The boy asked to be shot. He was immediately shot through the forehead.

Killed in the Pauma Massacre
1. Manuel Serrano
2. Ramon Aguilar
3. Francisco Basualdo
4. José María Alvarado
5. Mariano Dominguez
6. Santiago Osuna
7. Jose Lopez
8. Estaquio Ruiz
9. Juan de la Cruz
10. Unnamed New Mexican
11. Santos Alipas

Aftermath
When word of the massacre reached Mexican forces in Los Angeles, General José María Flores designated José del Carmen Lugo of San Bernardino to lead a group of soldiers to avenge the lancers' deaths.  The soldiers carried out their mission with the aid of allied Cahuilla Indians.  They killed an estimated 33-40 Luiseño warriors, including the leaders who had authorized the earlier attack on the Californios.  The action was called the Temecula Massacre.

Notes
According to Herbert Lockwood, Bill Marshall at one time was in love with Senorita Osuna.  She told Marshall to leave her alone, as she planned to marry José María Alvarado.  Marshall was heartbroken and angry.  He moved to Warner's ranch where he was hired as a foreman.  He married a Cupeno woman and was accepted as an unofficial member of her tribe.  When he saw Alvarado among the Californio prisoners, he saw an opportunity to take his revenge.
Some historians believe that Marshall had no part in the Pauma Massacre.

See also
List of massacres in California

References

Skeleton's Closet Revisited.  A Light Look at San Diego History Vl. 2, by Herbert Lockwood
The Indian Cemetery at Old Temecula, by Kevin Hallaran, Allene Archibald, Lowell J. Bean, and Sylvia B. Vane
The Historic Valley of Temecula.  The Temecula Massacre, by Horace Parker

Luiseño
Battles of the Conquest of California
1846 in Alta California
Massacres by Native Americans
Native American history of California
December 1846 events